This is a list of notable people who were born or have lived in various cities in Croatia.

Aržano
 Josip Jović (1969-1991), policeman.
 Ante Ledić (born 1939), businessman and politician.

Banjole
 Josip Crnobori (1907-2005), painter.

Batinske
 Ivan Lacković Croata (1932-2004), painter.

Benkovac
 Đorđe Čotra (born 1984), footballer.
 Ljubomir Crnokrak (born 1958), footballer.
 Saša Dobrić (born 1982), footballer.
 Šime Đodan (1927-2007), politician.
 Đorđe Gagić (born 1990), basketball.
 Milorad Pupovac (born 1955), politician and linguist.
 Milan Stegnjajić (born 1962), footballer.
 Živko Stojsavljević (1900-1978), painter.
 Savo Štrbac (born 1949), lawyer and author.
 Zoran Subotić (born 1958), politician and former military figure.
 Predrag Vranicki (1922-2002), Marxist Humanist and member of the Praxis school.

Bizovac
 Bratoljub Klaić (1909-1983), linguist and translator.

Bjelovar
 Đurđa Adlešič (born 1960), politician and former leader.
 Momčilo Bajagić Bajaga (born 1960), singer, songwriter and musician.
 Vojin Bakić (1915-1992), sculptor.
 Vesna Bedeković (born 1966), politician.
 Boris Buzančić (1929-2014), actor and politician.
 Slavko Cuvaj (1851-1931), politician.
 Silvije Degen (born 1942), lawyer and politician.
 Bogdan Diklić (born 1953), actor.
 Ivan Herenčić (1910-1978), general.
 Gordan Jandroković (born 1967), diplomat and politician.
 Zvonimir Janko (1932-2022), mathematician.
 Željko Karaula (born 1973), historian and author.
 Sonja Kovač (born 1984), actress, model and singer.
 Marin Lalić (born 1969), footballer midfielder.
 Marko Mesić (1901-1982), colonel.
 Charles Millot (1921-2003), actor.
 Anka Mrak-Taritaš (born 1959), politician and architect.
 Milena Mrazović (1863-1927), journalist, writer, piano, and composer.
 Bojan Navojec (born 1976), theatre and film actor.
 Goran Navojec (born 1970), actor and musician.
 Mario Petreković (born 1972), comedian, actor, television presenter and entertainer.
 Božidar Puretić (1921–1971), physician.
 Ferdo Rusan (1810–1879), reformer, composer and musician.
 Branko Souček (1930-2014), academic and computer scientist.
 Zdenko Strižić (1902-1990), architect, urban planner and teacher.
 Đuro Sudeta (1903-1927), writer.
 Hrvoje Tkalčić (born 1970), professor.
 Goran Tribuson (born 1948), prose and screenplay writer.
 Snježana Tribuson (born 1957), screenwriter and film director.
 Rudolf Vimer (1863-1933), writer, polyglot and benefactor.
 Dragutin Wolf (1866-1927), industrialist and founder of the food company Koestlin.

Blato
 Ivan Milat-Luketa (1922-2009), painter and sculptor.

Brela
 Đuro Vilović (1889-1958), writer.

Brist
 Mladen Veža (1916-2010), painter.

Čakovec
 Lidija Bajuk (born 1965), musician.
 Lujo Bezeredi (1898-1979), sculptor and painter.
 Srećko Bogdan (born 1957), footballer player and manager.
 Robert Jarni (born 1968), footballer player and manager.
 Željko Kipke (born 1953), artist.
 Ladislav Kralj-Međimurec (1891-1976), artist.
 Dražen Ladić (born 1963), footballer goalkeeper.
 Ivana Lisjak (born 1987), tennis player.
 Franjo Punčec (1913-1985), tennis player.
 Rudolf Steiner (1861-1925), philosopher.
 Josip Horvat Međimurec (1904-1945), painter.
 Josip Štolcer-Slavenski (1896-1955), composer.
 Filip Ude (born 1986), gymnast.
 Vinko Žganec (1890-1976), folklorist.
 Ivana Žnidarić (born 1985), model.
 Juraj IV Zrinski (1549-1603), soldier, politician and patron.
 Juraj V Zrinski (1599-1626), soldier and politician.
 Nikola Zrinski (1620-1664), soldier, poet and philosopher.
 Nikola Šubić Zrinski (1507/1508-1566), soldier and politician.
 Petar Zrinski (1621-1671), soldier, politician and poet.

Čaglin
 Zlatko Crnković (1931-2013), literary translator, writer, critic and editor.

Cavtat
 Valtazar Bogišić (1834-1908), jurist and a pioneer in sociology.
 Vlaho Bukovac (1855-1922), painter and academic.
 Ivo Ivaniš (1976-2003), water polo player.
 Niko Koprivica (1889-1944), politician.
 Tino Pattiera (1890-1966), Opera singer.
 Frano Supilo (1870-1917), politician and journalist.
 Ljudevit Vuličević (1839-1916), writer and patriot.
 Luko Zore (1846-1906), philologist and writer.

Čazma
 Vilko Begić (1874–1946), military officer.
 Janus Pannonius (1434–1472), latinist, poet, diplomat and bishop of pécs.
 Ivo Serdar (1933-1985), actor.
 Stephen II, Bishop of Zagreb (1190/95–1247), prelate of the Catholic Church who served as Bishop of Zagreb.
 Đuro Šurmin (1867-1937), literary historian and politician.

Darda
 Hugo Conrad von Hötzendorf (1806-1869), painter and art instructor.

Daruvar
 Milivoj Ašner (1913-2011), police chief.
 Dragomir Čumić (1937-2013), actor. 
 Eva Fischer (1920-2015), artist.
 David Frankfurter (1909-1982), Swiss branch leader.
 Branko Krga (born 1945), military officer.
 Josip Novakovich (born 1956), writer.

Donja Voća
 Slavko Stolnik (1929-1991), painter and sculptor.

Donji Dolac
 Petar Smajić (1910–1985), painter and sculptor.

Donji Vinjani
 Ivan Bušić Roša (1745–1783), hajduk commander.
 Ferdo Bušić (1948-2011), historian.
 Bruno Bušić (1939–1978), Croatian dissident.
 Ante Rebić (born 1993), professional football player.

Dubrovnik

Duga Resa
 Antun Stipančić (1949-1991), professional table tennis player.
 Miroslav Šutej (1936-2005), painter and graphic artist.

Glina
 Natko Devčić (1914-1997), composer.
 Stefan Hajdin (born 1994), professional footballer.
 Slavko Hirsch (1893-1942), physician, founder and director.
 Stephan Schulzer von Müggenburg (1802-1892), army officer and mycologist.
 Zlatko Šulentić (1893-1971), painter of landscapes and portraits.

Gola
 Martin Mehkek (1936-2014), painter.
 Ivan Večenaj (1920-2013), painter.

Gospić
 Jakov Blažević (1912-1996), politician.
 Matija Čanić (1901-1964), military officer.
 Nada Dimić (1923-1942), partisan.
 Marko Došen (1859-1944), writer and politician.
 Dušan Dragosavac (1919-2014), politician.
 Josip Filipović (1818-1889), general.
 Milovan Gavazzi (1895-1992), ethnographer.
 Edo Kovačević (1906-1993), artist.
 Ferdinand Kovačević (1838–1913), inventor, engineer, and pioneer.
 Miroslav Kraljević (1885-1913), painter, printmaker and sculptor.
 Milan Mandarić (born 1938), businessman and footballer.
 Darko Milinović (born 1963), politician and gynecologist.
 Ante Nikšić (1892-1962), lawyer and politician.
 Marko Orešković (1895-1941), commander.
 Ante Pavelić (1869-1938), dentist and politician.
 Mathias Rukavina von Boynograd (1737-1817), general.
 Ante Starčević (1823-1896), politician and writer.
 David Starčević (1840-1918), politician.
 Mile Starčević (1862-1917), politician and lawyer.
 Mile Starčević (1904-1953), politician.
 Šime Starčević (1784–1859), priest and linguist.
 Nikica Valentić (born 1950), entrepreneur, lawyer and politician.
 Ante Vrban (1908-1948), deputy commander.

Grohote
 Eugen Buktenica (1914–1997), painter.

Hlebine
 Dragan Gaži (1930-1983), painter.
 Ivan Generalić (1914-1992), painter.
 Josip Generalić (1935–2004), painter.
 Franjo Mraz (1910-1981), artist.

Hvar
 Francesco Antonio Bertucci (1550-1626), dalmatian friar, knight hospitaller, adventurer and an agent of the Holy Roman Empire.
 Hanibal Lucić (1485–1553), Renaissance poet and playwright.
 Grga Novak (1888-1978), historian, archaeologist and geographer.
 Mikša Pelegrinović (1500-1562), poet.
 Slobodan Prosperov Novak (born 1951), literature historian, comparativist and theatrologist.
 Juan Vucetich (1858-1925), anthropologist and police official who pioneered the use of dactyloscopy.

Imotski
 Ante Aračić (born 1986), footballer.
 Ante Babaja (1927-2010), film director and screenwriter.
 Ivan Bašić (born 2002), footballer.
 Zvonimir Boban (born 1968), footballer.
 Zdravka Bušić (born 1950), politician.
 Dragutin Čelić (born 1962), footballer.
 Žarko Domljan (1932-2020), politician.
 Gabre Gabric (1914-2015), track and field athlete.
 Marin Glavaš (born 1992), footballer.
 Vlado Gotovac (1930-2000), poet and politician.
 Hrvatin Gudelj (born 1978), footballer.
 Ivan Gudelj (born 1960), footballer.
 Josip Jurčević (born 1951), historian and politician.
 Veljko Kadijević (1925-2014), general.
 Mislav Karoglan (born 1982), footballer.
 Mladen Karoglan (born 1964), footballer.
 Ivan Katanušić (born 1991), athlete.
 Miroslav Krištić (born 1990), footballer.
 Milan Kujundžić (born 1957), physician and politician.
 Marijan Lišnjić (1609-1686), bishop.
 Mate Maras (born 1939), translator.
 Ivan Milas (born 1975), footballer.
 Stanko Mršić (born 1955), footballer.
 Dragan Mustapić (born 1963), discus thrower.
 Jurica Puljiz (born 1979), footballer.
 Ivan Radeljić (born 1980), footballer.
 Ivan Rendić (1849-1932), sculptor.
 Petar Šuto (born 1980), footballer.
 Silvija Talaja (born 1978), professional tennis player.
 Iva Todorić (born 1993), basketball. 
 Neda Ukraden (born 1950), singer.
 Antun Vrdoljak (born 1931), film actor and director.

Ivankovo
 Dubravko Mataković (born 1959), illustrator best known for his grotesque comic books.

Jastrebarsko
 Ljubo Babić (1890-1974), artist, museum curator and literary critic.
 Mihael Zmajlović (born 1978), economist and politician.

Jelsa
 Antun Dobronić (1878-1955), composer and pupil.
 Juraj Dobrović (born 1928), artist, sculpture, painting and graphic arts.
 Ivo Gamulin Gianni (born 1971), theatrical, television performer and singer.

Karanac
 Pavao Štalter (1929-2021), animator, director, screenwriter, scenographer and artist.

Karlovac
 Borislav Cvetković (born 1964), Yugoslav footballer.
 Zrinka Cvitešić (born 1979), theatre and film actress.
 Jelka Glumičić (born 1941), human rights activist.
 Dejan Jakovic (born 1985), Canadian soccer player.
 Dragojla Jarnević (1813–1875), poet.
 Ljudevit Jonke (1907-1979), linguist.
 Vjekoslav Karas (1821–1858), 19th-century painter.
 Tomislav Krizman (1882-1955), painter, graphic artist, costume and set designer.
 Alfred Freddy Krupa (born 1971), painter - pioneer of the New Ink Art movement.
 Ivan Mažuranić (1814–1890), poet, linguist and politician.
 Gajo Petrović (1927–1993), author and philosopher.
 Vladimir Pogačić (1919-1999), film director.
 Slava Raškaj (1877–1906), painter.
 Dejan Šorak (born 1954), film director and screenwriter.
 Mirko and Stjepan Seljan, explorers.
 Vanja Sutlić (1925-1989), philosopher.
 Ana Vidović (born 1980), classical guitarist.
 Maksimilijan Vrhovac (1752–1827), bishop of Zagreb.
 Alfred Krupa Sr. (1915-1989), Silesia born painter, inventor and sportsman.

Kaštel Novi
 Ante Peterlić (1936-2007), screenwriter and film director.
 Marin Studin (1895-1960), sculptor.

Klanjec
 Oton Iveković (1869-1939), painter.

Ključ
 Ivan Rabuzin (1921-2008), artist.

Kloštar Podravski
 Petar Grgec (1933-2006), artist.

Knin
 Ratko Adamović (born 1942), writer.
 Dragana Atlija (born 1986), model and actress.
 Frane Cota (1898-1951), sculptor.
 Electra Elite (born 1977), singer and sex worker.
 Branko Grčić (born 1964), politician and economist.
 Vojin Jelić (1921-2004), writer and poet.
 Drago Kovačević (1953-2019), politician and writer.
 Ljubomir Marić (born 1977), politician.
 Mirko Marjanović (1937-2006), politician.
 Milan Martić (born 1954), politician and war criminal.
 Lovro Monti (1835-1898), politician.
 Zdravko Ponoš (born 1962), politician, former diplomat, and retired general.
 Hrvoje Požar (1916-1991), engineer and one of the top world scientists.
 Jovan Rašković (1929-1992), psychiatrist, academic and politician.
 Dinko Šimunović (1873-1933), writer.
 Janko Veselinović (born 1965), academic and politician.
 Soraja Vučelić (born 1986), glamour model, media personality and socialite.
 Dušan Zelenbaba (born 1952), physician and politician.

Komiža
 Ranko Marinković (1913-2001), novelist and dramatist.

Konavle
 Anzelmo Katić (1715–1792), franciscan and prelate.

Koprivnica
 Anđelo Jurkas (born 1977), writer, film director, publicist, novelist, essayist, lyricist and screenwriter.
 Milivoj Solar (born 1936), literary theorist and literary historian.

Korčula
 Drago Marin Cherina (born 1949), sculptor and artist.

Kotoriba
 Joža Horvat (1915-2012), writer.
 Ignacije Szentmartony (1718-1793), priest, missionary, mathematician, astronomer, explorer and cartographer.

Kovačić
 Momčilo Đujić (1907-1999), Vojvoda and Ravna Gora Movement of Serbian Chetniks.

Krapina
 Josip Seissel (1904-1987), architect and urban planner.

Krk
 Tuone Udaina (1823-1898), Being the last person to have any active knowledge of the Dalmatian language.

Kuna
 Mato Celestin Medović (1857-1920), painter.
 John Totich (1882-1957), gum-digger, boarding-house keeper, community leader and consul.

Kuna Pelješka
 Zvonimir Roso (1938-1997), criminologist and psychologist.

Labin
 Matteo Giulio Bartoli (1873-1946), linguist.
 Mate Blažina (1925-1945), antifascist, military commander and Yugoslav National Hero.
 Tino Černjul (born 1973), handballer.
 Ema Derossi-Bjelajac (1926-2020), politician.
 Matthias Flacius (1520-1575), theologian, church historian and philosopher.
 Valter Marković (born 1959), handballer.
 Fran Mileta (born 2000), handballer.
 Anđelo Milevoj (born 1941), footballer.
 Josip Mohorović (born 1948), footballer.
 Orlando Mohorović (born 1950), artist.
 Daniel Načinović (born 1952), poet, prose writer, essayist, journalist, and translator.
 Renato Percan (1936-2013), painter.
 Adriana Prosenjak (born 1963), handball coach and player.
 Andrej Prskalo (born 1987), footballer.
 Mladen Prskalo (born 1968), handballer.
 Bruno Veselica (1936-2018), footballer.

Lepoglava
 Milan Šufflay (1879-1931), historian and politician.

Ličko Novo Selo
 Josip Perković (born 1945), director.

Lipovljani
 Nina Kraljić (born 1992), singer-songwriter and voice actress.

Lošinj
 Archduke Wilhelm of Austria (1895-1948), colonel and poet.

Lovran
 Charles Billich (born 1934), sculptor and painter.

Majske Poljane
 Đuro Kurepa (1907-1993), mathematician.
 Svetozar Kurepa (1929-2010), mathematician.
 Simeon Roksandić (1874-1943), sculptor and academic.

Makarska
 Giuseppe Addobbati (1909-1986), film actor.
 Jure Bilić (1922-2006), communist politician.
 Ivan Božić (1915-1977), historian and academic.
 Marin Brbić (born 1961), businessman and economist.
 Stipe Delić (1925-1999), film director.
 Nikola Katic (born 1986), footballer.
 Dražen Lalić (born 1960), sociologists.
 Olja Luetić (born 1991), product designer and fashion designer.
 Leopold Novak (born 1990), footballer.
 Žanamari Perčić (born 1981), recording artist.
 Jure Radić (1953-2016), civil engineer and politician.
 Ivo Raffanelli (born 1965), commander of the Croatian Navy.
 Nera Stipičević (born 1983), pop singer and actress.
 Ivo Visković (born 1949), professor, politician and diplomat.

Mali Lošinj
 Tonino Picula (born 1961), politician.

Medak
 Dušan Vuksan (1881-1944), pedagogue, historian, editor and prominent representative.

Metković
 Ivan Slamnig (1930-2001), poet, novelist, literary theorist and translator.

Molve
 Mijo Kovačić (born 1935), painter.

Murter
 Nikola Bašić (born 1946), architect.

Našice
 Stanko Bilinski (1909-1998), mathematician and academician.
 Stipe Buljan (born 1983), footballer.
 Dalibor Davidović (born 1972), musicologist and university professor.
 Herman Ehrlich (1836-1895), architect and businessman.
 Toni Fruk (born 2001), footballer.
 Matej Jelić (born 1990), footballer.
 Pavle Jurina (1954-2011), handballer.
 Mihael Klepač (born 1997), footballer.
 Tin Kontrec (born 1989), handballer.
 Izidor Kršnjavi (1845-1927), painter, art historian, curator and politician.
 Marko Lešković (born 1991), footballer.
 Teodor Pejačević (1855-1928), politician.
 Danijel Pranjić (born 1981), footballer.
 Danijel Stojanović (born 1984), footballer.
 Tomislav Torjanac (born 1972), illustrator.

Nova Kapela
 Ivanka Brađašević (born 1955), poet, writer and librarian.

Novi Marof
 Rudolf Cvek (1946-2005), footballer.
 Blaženko Lacković (born 1980), handballer.
 Mirko Rački (1879–1982), painter.

Novi Varoš
 Vinko Vrbanić (born 1951), writer.

Novska
 Gjuro Szabo (1875-1943), historian, art conserver and museologist.
 Vladimir Tadej (1925-2017), production designer, screenwriter and film director.

Omilje
 Anka Krizmanić (1896-1987), painter and printmaker.

Orahovica
 Zorko Čanadi (1925-2003), General of the Yugoslav People's Army (JNA).
 Robert Domany (1908-1942), Partisan and a People's Hero of Yugoslavia.
 Stjepan Ivšić (1884-1962), linguist, Slavic specialist, and accentologist.
 Stjepan Mesić (born 1934), lawyer and politician.
 Gojko Zec (1935-1995), football manager.

Orebić
 Petar Šegedin (1926-1994), steeplechase and long-distance runner.
 Marija Tolj (born 1999), athlete.
 Ivan Tomašević (1897-1988), labourer and political activist.

Oriovac
 Stjepan Babić (1925-2021), linguist and academic.

Osijek

Otočac
 Stjepan Jovanović (1828-1885), military commander.

Pađene
 Marija Ilić Agapova (1895-1984), jurist, translator, librarian, civil rights activist and the first director.

Pakrac
 Zlatko Aleksovski (born 1960), prison commander.
 Smilja Avramov (1918-2018), academician, legal scholar, social activist and educator in international law.
 Damir Bajs (born 1964), politician.
 Đorđe Bogić (1911-1941), protopresbyter.
 Zoran Erceg (born 1985), basketball.
 Zdenko Gašparović (born 1937), animator, screenwriter and artist.
 Milan Horvat (1919-2014), conductor.
 Tomislav Ivičić (born 1987), footballer.
 Jadranka Kosor (born 1953), politician and journalist.
 Božo Kovačević (born 1955), politician and diplomat.
 Saša Krajnović (born 1989), footballer.
 Sven Lasta (1925-1996), television and film actor.
 Zoran Popović (born 1988), footballer.
 Žarko Potočnjak (1946-2021), theatre, television and film actor.
 Slobodan Selenić (1933-1995), writer, literary critic, dramatist, academic and university professor.

Pazin
 Martin Cotar (born 1977), cyclist.
 Juraj Cvečić (1520-1585), translator, preacher and editor of Protestant books.
 Luigi Dallapiccola (1904-1975), composer.
 Juraj Dobrila (1812–1882), catholic bishop.
 Antonela Ferenčić (born 1994), cyclist.
 Gino De Finetti (1877-1955), painter.
 Antun Kalac (1849-1919), poet, writer, playwright, literary translator, and revivalist.
 Veljko Ostojić (born 1958), politician.
 Pier Antonio Quarantotti Gambini (1910-1965), writer and journalist, author of novels, poetry, and essays.
 Radojka Šverko (born 1948), singer-songwriter and an alto range artist.
 Josip Ujčić (1880-1964), Council Father and a member of the Central Commission for the Preparation.
 Milan Zgrablić (born 1960), archbishop.

Peteranec
 Ivan Sabolić (1921–1986), sculptor.

Petrinja
 Svetozar Delić (1885-1967), politician and revolutionary.
 Iva Despić-Simonović (1891-1961), sculptor.
 Krsto Hegedušić (1901-1975), painter, illustrator and theater designer.
 Branko Horvat (1928-2003), economist and politician.
 Franjo Jelačić (1746-1810), general officer.
 Aleksandar Jovančević (born 1970), strength and conditioning coach and former wrestler.
 Slavko Koletić (1950-2010), wrestler.
 Ivan Kožarić (1921-2020), media, including: permanent and temporary sculptures, assemblages, proclamations, photographs, paintings, and installations.
 Oton Kučera (1857-1931), astronomer.
 Vlado Lisjak (born 1962), Greco-Roman wrestler.
 Boris Miholjević (born 1938), theater, television and film actor.
 Stevan Šupljikac (1786–1848), officer and colonel.
 Aleksandar Ugrenović (1883-1958), university professor.
 Marijan Vlak (born 1955), footballer.
 Emil Vojnović (1851-1927), general and historian.

Polača
 Jovan Radulović (1951-2018), writer and former director.

Požega
 Željko Adžić (born 1965), footballer.
 Valentin Barišić (born 1966), footballer.
 Bruno Boban (1992-2018), footballer.
 Gabrijel Boban (born 1989), footballer.
 Zlatko Bourek (1929–2018), film director, screenwriter, production designer, cartoonist and expert.
 Srđan Budisavljević (1883-1968), politician and lawyer.
 Dino Butorac (born 1990), basketball.
 Dobriša Cesarić (1902-1980), poet and translator.
 Zlatko Crnković (1931-2013), literary translator, writer, critic and editor.
 Nada Gačešić-Livaković (born 1951), actress.
 Tamara Horacek (born 1995), handballer.
 Luka Ibrišimović (1620–1698), friar.
 Tvrtko Jakovina (born 1972), historian.
 Dino Jelusick (born 1992), rock singer, musician, and songwriter.
 Antun Kanižlić (1699-1777), jesuit and poet.
 Ivana Kindl (born 1978), singer.
 Marko Kopljar (born 1986), handballer.
 Friedrich Salomon Krauss (1859-1938), sexologist, ethnographer, folklorist, and slavist.
 Dragutin Lerman (1863-1918), explorer.
 Predrag Matić (born 1962), centre-left politician.
 Vilim Messner (1904-1988), athlete.
 Svetlana Mičić (born 1960), handballer.
 Leo Mikić (born 1997), footballer.
 Dejana Milosavljević (born 1994), handballer.
 Nenad Mirosavljević (born 1994), footballer.
 Matej Mitrović (born 1993), footballer.
 Pavao Muhić (1811-1897), lawyer and politician.
 Mia Oremović (1918-2010), theatre, film and television actress.
 Nikica Pušić-Koroljević (born 1938), handballer.
 Vjekoslav Vojo Radoičić (1930-2017), painter, sculptor, printmaker, and stage designer.
 Mimi Saric (born 1983), footballer.
 Ante Šercer (1896-1968), physician.
 Peja Stojaković (born 1977), basketball.
 Filip Uremović (born 1997), footballer.
 Marko Zelenika (born 1987), footballer.

Pučišća
 Branislav Dešković (1889-1939), sculptor.
 Nikola Eterović (born 1951), archbishop.
 Miro Kačić (1946-2001), linguist.

Pula
 Susy Andersen (born 1940), Italian actress. 
 Laura Antonelli (1941-2015), Italian actress, born in Pola, then lived in Italy (her family is from Pisino/Pazin).
 Giovanni Arpino (1927–1987), Italian writer and journalist.
 Vladimir Arsenijević (born 1965), Serbian novelist, columnist, translator, editor, musician, and publisher.
 Lidia Bastianich (born 1947), American television chef and business mogul, was born near Pula.
 Boris Domagoj Biletić (born 1957), Croatian poet, literary critic, essayist, publicist and translator.
 Sergio Blažić (1951-1987), Croatian hard rock musician.
 Erma Bossi (1875-1952), German Expressionist painter.
 Franko Božac (born 1974), Croatian classical accordion performer.
 Davor Božinović (born 1961), Croatian diplomat and politician.
 Fausto Budicin (born 1981), Croatian footballer for HNK Rijeka of the Prva HNL.
 Egidio Bullesi (1905-1929), Croatian sailor.
 Tony Cetinski (born 1969), Croatian pop singer.
 Crispus (c. 300–326), Roman emperor Constantine the Great and his junior emperor.
 Branko Črnac Tusta (1955-2012), Croatian singer.
 Lilia Dale (born 1919), Italian retired film actress.
 Maria Luisa Dalla Chiara (born 1938), Italian logician and philosopher of science.
 Jolanda di Maria Petris (1916—1987), Italian-Finnish operatic soprano and voice pedagog.
 Jadranka Đokić (born 1981), Croatian actress.
 Wilhelm Ehm (1918-2009), World War II Wehrmacht veteran and East German.
 Archduchess Eleonora of Austria (1886-1974), Archduke Charles Stephen of Austria and a first cousin of King Alphonso XIII of Spain.
 Sergio Endrigo (1933-2005), Italian singer-songwriter, was born in Pola, then Italy.
 Alen Floričić (born 1968), Croatian artist, working in ambient and installation art.
 Franz Karl Ginzkey (1871-1963), Austrian officer, poet and writer.
 Vesna Girardi-Jurkić (1944-2012), Croatian archeologist and museologist.
 Alojz Gradnik (1882-1967), Slovenian poet, worked in Pula as a judge.
 Peđa Grbin (born 1979), Croatian lawyer and politician.
 Harry Hardt (1899-1980), Austrian actor.
 Stjepan Hauser (born 1986), Croatian cellist.
 István Horthy (1904-1942), Hungarian regent Admiral Miklós Horthy's eldest son, a politician, and, during World War II, a fighter pilot.
 Miklós Horthy Jr. (1907-1993), Hungarian regent Admiral Miklós Horthy and, until the end of World War II, a politician.
 Aurelio Juri (born 1949), Slovenian politician and journalist of Italian ethnic origin.
 Bruno Juričić (born 1977), Croatian architect.
 Luka Juričić (born 1983), Croatian actor.
 Archduke Karl Albrecht of Austria (1888-1951), Austrian and Polish officer and landowner.
 Robert Koch (1843-1910), physician, worked on the nearby Brioni islands (today:Brijuni).
 Boris Komnenić (1957-2021), Serbian actor.
 Archduke Leo Karl of Austria (1893-1939), Austrian military officer.
 Srđan Majstorović (born 1972),  Serbian political scientist.
 Maximianus of Ravenna (499–556), bishop of Ravenna in Italy.
 Teo Mikelić (born 1992), Croatian kickboxer fighting.
 Nelida Milani (born 1939), Istrian Italian writer from Croatia.
 Boris Miletić (born 1975), Croatian economist and politician.
 Anna Maria Mori (born 1936), Italian novelist and journalist.
 Antun Motika (1902-1992), Croatian artist.
 Sergio Noja Noseda (1931-2008), Italian professor.
 Karl Novak (1905-1975), Slovenian military officer.
 Tamara Obrovac (born 1962), Croatian singer, composer, songwriter and flutist.
 Johann Palisa (1848-1925), Austrian astronomer and director of the observatory at Pula, discovered ca. 30 asteroids.
 Goran Parlov (born 1967), Croatian comic book artist.
 Mate Parlov (1948-2008), greatest Croatian boxer of all time; one of the greatest Croatian sportspeople of the 20th century.
 Wilhelm Pelikan (1893-1981), German-Austrian chemist, anthroposophist, pharmacist, gardener and anthroposophical medicine practitioner.
 Toni Perković (born 1998),  Croatian professional basketball.
 Silvano Poropat (born 1971), Croatian professional basketball coach.
 Herman Potočnik (pseudonym Hermann Noordung) (1892-1929), rocket engineer and pioneer of cosmonautics (astronautics), was born in Pula to Slovene parents.
 Lisa von Pott (born 1888), Austrian espionage agent, sculptor, secretary to the poet Rabindranath Tagore.
 Furio Radin (born 1950), Croatian politician.
 Prince Rainer of Saxe-Coburg and Gotha (1900-1945), Cadet of a reigning German dynasty.
 Stiven Rivić (born 1985), Croatian footballer of the German club Energie Cottbus.
 Rossana Rossanda (1924-2020), Italian communist politician, journalist, and feminist.
 Massimo Savić (born 1962), Croatian pop singer.
 Elvis Scoria (born 1971), former Croatian footballer and current coach of NK Istra 1961.
 Jadranka Skorin-Kapov (born 1955), Croatian professor.
 Antonio Smareglia (1854–1929), Italian composer.
 Sonja Smolec (born 1953), Croatian artist, writer, and poet.
 Roberto Soffici (born 1946), Italian pop singer-songwriter, composer and lyricist.
 Valentino Stepčić (born 1990), footballer.
 Ivana Stojiljković (born 1981), Serbian politician.
 Antonio Tarsia (1643–1722), Italian composer.
 Pietro Tradonico (800-864), Doge of Venice from 836 to 864.
 Sven Ušić (born 1959), Croatian professional basketball player and coach.
 Alida Valli (real name: Alida Maria Laura Altenburger, Baroness von Marckenstein und Frauenberg) (1921-2006), Italian actress, was born in  Pola, then lived in Italy.
 Dijana Vidušin (born 1982), Croatian film, theatre and television actress.
 Alen Vitasović (born 1968), Croatian pop singer and songwriter.
 Antonio Vojak (1904-1975), Croatian football player.
 Goran Volarevic (born 1977), Croatian and Italian male water polo player.
 Alka Vuica (born 1961), Croatian singer, lyricist and TV presenter.
 Damir Zobenica (born 1981), Serbia politician.
 Georg Ludwig von Trapp (1880-1947), Austrian naval hero and head of the famous singing family immortalized in the musical The Sound of Music lived in Pula, his father August von Trapp and other relatives are buried there.
 Hede von Trapp (1877-1947), sister of George Ritter von Trapp, Austrian painter.

Rab
 Marino Bizzi (1570–1624), archbishop of antivari.
 Mario Fafangel (1914-2007), sailor.
 Saint Marinus (275-366), Early Christian and the founder of a chapel and monastery in 301 from whose initial community the state of San Marino later grew..
 Ivan Rabljanin (1470–1540), most of his works are in Dubrovnik.

Rijeka
 Vojin Dimitrijević (1932-2012), professor, public intellectual, and a prominent Serbian human rights activist and international law expert.
 Slavenka Drakulić (born 1949), journalist, novelist, and essayist.
 Bonaventura Duda (1924-2017), theologian, biblical scholar, and franciscan.
 Kolinda Grabar-Kitarović (born 1968), politician.
 Ödön von Horváth (1901-1938), playwright and novelist.
 Janko Polić Kamov (1886-1910), writer and poet.
 William Klinger (1972-2015), historian.
 Zoran Krušvar (born 1977), psychologist, science fiction and fantasy writer.
 Siniša Majkus (born 1962), contemporary sculptor.
 Tina Mihelić (born 1988), sports sailor.
 Roberto Paliska (born 1963), footballer.
 Osvaldo Ramous (1905-1981), poetry, prose, drama, essayist prose, criticism, journalism, culture organization, editorial work, translation, and he was also a director of cultural institutions.
 Rudi Šeligo (1935-2004), writer, playwright, essayist and politician.
 Dorjana Širola (born 1972), quizzer, linguist, anglicist and software tester.
 Tea Tulić (born 1978), writer.
 Mladen Urem (born 1946), literary critic, author and editor.
 Leo Valiani (1909-1999), historian, politician and journalist.
 Valentino Zeichen (1938-2016), poet and writer.

Rupe
 Duje Jurić (born 1956), contemporary artist.

Sali
 Božidar Finka (1925-1999), linguist.

Senj
 Lidija Abrlić (born 1969), basketball.
 Krunoslav Babić (1875-1953), zoologist.
 Milan Ćopić (1897-1941), communist.
 Vladimir Ćopić (1891-1939), revolutionary, politician, journalist and communist leader.
 Dario Dabac (born 1978), footballer and manager.
 Nikola Jurišić (1490-1545), nobleman, soldier, and diplomat.
 Silvije Strahimir Kranjčević (1865-1908), poet.
 Neda Krmpotić (1921-1974), journalist.
 Mateša Antun Kuhačević (1697-1772), poet and politician.
 Ivan Marković (1928-2006), footballer and manager.
 Milan Moguš (1927-2017), linguist and academician.
 Vjenceslav Novak (1859-1905), writer, dramatist, and music historian.
 Ivan Paskvić (1754-1829), astronomer, physicist and mathematician.
 Pavao Ritter Vitezović (1652-1713), historian, linguist, publisher, poet, political theorist, diplomat, printmaker, draughtsman, cartographer, writer and printer.
 Tomislav Rogić (born 1965), bishop.
 Sandra Šarić (born 1984), taekwondo athlete.
 Ivo Senjanin (1571-1612), historical sources.
 Josip Šojat (born 1948), handballer.
 Pavao Tijan (1908-1997), encyclopaedist.
 Josef Philipp Vukassovich (1755-1809), soldier.

Sesvete
 Nikola Tanhofer (1926-1998), film director, screenwriter and cinematographer.

Šibenik
 Nikica Cukrov (born 1954), former footballer and manager.
 Juraj Šižgorić (1445-1509), latinist poet.
 Krešimir Baranović (1894-1975), composer and conductor. 
 Ivo Brešan (1936-2017), writer.
 Natale Bonifacio (1537/38-1592), producer.
 Perica Bukić (born 1966), water polo player.
 Luka Bukić (born 1994), water polo player.
 Arsen Dedić (1938-2015), musician. 
 Vice Vukov (1936-2008), singer and politician.
 Roberto Ferruzzi (1853-1934), painter. 
 Angelo Antonio Frari (1780-1865), physician, epidemiologist, historian of medicine, and protomedicus of Venice.
 Danira Gović (born 1972), actress.
 Siniša Kelečević (born 1970), Croatian basketball player.
 Mišo Kovač (born 1941), pop and schlager singer.
 Peter Krešimir IV of Croatia (1058-1075), King of Croatia.
 Anthony Maglica (born 1930), inventor.
 Mate Maleš (born 1989), footballer.
 Hrvoje Matković (1923–2010), historian.
 Maksim Mrvica (born 1975), pianist.
 Dražen Petrović (1964-1993), basketball player.
 Martino Rota (1520-1583), engraver.
 Gordon Schildenfeld (born 1985), footballer.
 Ante Rukavina (born 1986), footballer.
 Ante Kulušić (born 1986), footballer. 
 Aleksandar Petrović (born 1959), basketball player and head coach.
 Giorgio da Sebenico (1410-1473), architect and sculptor.
 Murat-beg Tardić, Ottoman-Croatian general.
 St. Nikola Tavelić (1340-1391), first Croatian saint.
 Niccolò Tommaseo (1802-1874), Dalmatian-Italian linguist and journalist.
 Faust Vrančić (1551-1617), inventor.
 Goran Višnjić (born 1972), Croatian–American actor, best known for his role on ER.
 Leon Lučev (born 1970), actor.
 Antun Vrančić (1504-1573), writer. 
 Dario Šarić (born 1994), basketball player.
 Neven Spahija (born 1962), basketball coach.
 Antonija Sandrić (born 1988), female basketball player. 
 Tonino Picula (born 1961), politician. 
 Miro Bilan (born 1989), basketball player. 
 Henrik Širko (born 1993), basketball player. 
 Predrag Šarić (born 1959), basketball player.
 Veselinka Šarić (born 1971), female basketball player.
 Nik Slavica (born 1997), basketball player.
 Željko Burić (born 1955), politician and mayor of Šibenik. 
 Ivica Tucak (born 1970), water polo player and coach.
 Renato Vrbičić (1970-2018), water polo player and coach. 
 Vinko Brešan (born 1964), film producer.
 Danira Nakić (born 1969), female basketball player. 
 Vanda Baranović-Urukalo (born 1971), female basketball player.
 Petar Nadoveza (born 1942), footballer.
 Krasnodar Rora (1945-2020), footballer.
 Dean Računica (born 1969), footballer and manager.
 Goran Pauk (born 1962), footballer and current prefect of Šibenik-Knin County. 
 Duje Ćaleta-Car (born 1996), footballer, a part of the Croatia national team at the 2018 World Cup. 
 Dražan Jerković (1936-2008), footballer and the first manager of the Croatia national team since independence.
 Ines Fančović (1925-2011), actress.
 Ivan Vitić (1917-1986), architect. 
 Ivica Žurić (born 1965), basketball player.
 Miro Jurić (born 1972), basketball player and coach.
 Antonio Petković (born 1986), water polo player.
 Franko Nakić (born 1972), Greek basketball player.
 Mile Nakić (born 1942), Croatian–Greek water polo player and coach.
 Igor Cukrov (born 1984), singer, represented Croatia at the 2009 Eurovision Song Contest alongside Andrea Šušnjara. 
 Jeronimo Šarin (born 1974), basketball coach. 
 Edi Dželalija (born 1969), basketball coach.
 Igor Mandić (1939-2022), writer, literary critic, columnist and essayist.
 Franko Škugor (born 1987), tennis player, interim head coach of the Croatia national team in 2019.
 Martin Junaković (born 1994), basketball player.
 Stipe Bačelić-Grgić (born 1988), footballer.
 Denis Periša (born 1983), whistle blower and computer hacker.
 Tina Periša (born 1984), basketball player.
 Stipe Bralić (born 1973), basketball coach.
 Maja Cvjetković (born 1985), Miss Croatia.
 Ante Županović (born 1949), politician,  mayor of Šibenik from 2009 to 2013.
 Vinko Nikolić (1912-1997), writer, poet, and journalist.
 Nedjeljka Klarić (born 1954), politician, mayoress of Šibenik from 2005 to 2009.
 Hana Jušić (born 1983), film director.
 Goran Tomić (born 1977), football player and manager.

Sisak
 Bisera Veletanlic (born 1942), serbian pop singer.
 Bobby Bosko Grubic (aka Bobby G) (born 1972), singer/songwriter, director, producer.
 David Haines (1970-2014), British aid worker who was captured by ISIL.
 Desiderius Hampel (1895-1981), commander of the 13th Waffen-SS Mountain Division during World War II.
 Goran Dević (born 1971), film director and screenwriter.
 Hrvoje Klasić (born 1972), historian.
 Ivica Horvat (1926-2012), footballer and manager.
 Ivan Medarić (1912-1990), footballer.
 Ivica Senzen (born 1951), footballer.
 Janko Bobetko (1919-2003), Croatian Army general.
 Sveti Kvirin Sisački, patron saint, bishop.
 Lisa Nemec (born 1984), long-distance runner.
 Ljudevit Posavski, 9th-century prince.
 Marijan Mrmić (born 1965), footballer/coach.
 Mario Garba (born 1977), footballer.
 Mika Špiljak (1916-2007), politician.
 Miroslav Miletić (1925-2018), composer and viola player.
 Monika Babok (born 1991), swimmer.
 Hrvoje Klasić (born 1972), historian.
 Stjepan Lamza (1940-2022), footballer.
 Stjepan Radić (1871-1928), politician.
 Tamás Erdődy (1558-1624), ban.
 Viktor Špišić (born 1982), footballer.
 Vladimir Laxa (1870-1945), highly decorated veteran of the First World War.
 Vladimir Majder (1911-1943), Croatian partisan and Spanish Civil War veteran.

Slatina
 Eugen Dasović (1896-1980), footballer.
 Milko Kelemen (1924-2018), composer.
 Filip Veger (born 1994), tennis player.
 Viktor Žmegač (1929-2022), musicologist and scholar.

Slavonski Brod
 Zdenko Balaš (born 1940), rower at the 1964 Summer Olympics for Yugoslavia.
 Vladimir Becić (1886-1954)
 Ivanka Brađašević (born 1955)
 Ivana Brlić-Mažuranić (1874-1938)
 Đuro Đaković (1886-1929)
 Filip Erceg (born 1979)
 Vjekoslav Klaić (1849-1928)
 Mario Mandžukić (born 1986)
 Matija Mesić (1826-1878)
 Kosta Mušicki (1897-1946)
 Ivica Olić (born 1979)
 Branko Radičević (1824-1853)
 Matija Antun Relković (1732-1798)
 Marko Rothmüller (1908-1993)
 Branko Ružić (1919-1997)
 Mia Slavenska (1916-2002)
 Dragutin Tadijanović (1905-2007)
 Mario Vrančić (born 1989)
 Josip Weber (born 1964)
 Ivica Miljković (born 1947)

Smiljan
 Kata Pejnović (1899-1966), feminist and politician.
 Nikola Tesla (1856-1943), inventor, electrical engineer, mechanical engineer, and futurist.

Solin
 Ljubo Boban (1933-1994), historian and academic.
 Joško Jeličić (born 1971), footballer.
 Jozo Kljaković (1889-1969), painter.
 Ante Režić (born 1988), footballer.
 Josip Solić (born 1988), footballer.
 Bogdan Žižić (1934-2021), film director and screenwriter.

Split
 Acija Alfirević (born 1951), academic, lecturer, professor, feminist, scientist, writer and literary translator.
 Arsen Anton Ostojić (born 1965), film director and screenwriter.
 Lana Barić (born 1979), actress.
 Toma Bebić (1935-1990), multidisciplinary artist: musician, writer, actor, painter and poet.
 Ena Begović (1960-2000), actress.
 Alija Behmen (1940-2018), politician.
 Vili Beroš (born 1964), politician and neurosurgeon.
 Enzo Bettiza (1927-2017), novelist, journalist and politician.
 Stipe Biuk (born 2002), footballer.
 Blaženko Boban (born 1960), politician.
 Jagoda Buić (1930-2022), visual artist.
 Zoran Bujas (1910-2004), psychologist.
 Helena Bulaja (born 1971), multimedia artist, film director, scriptwriter, designer and film producer.
 Viktor Đerek (born 2000), photographer.
 Jelena Đokić (born 1977), actress.
 Boris Dvornik (1939-2008), actor.
 Stipe Erceg (born 1974), actor.
 Kristina Elez (born 1987), handballer.
 Bruna Esih (born 1975), politician and croatologist.
 Marina Fernandez (born 1981), actress.
 Mimi Fiedler (born 1975), actress.
 Zlatko Gall (born 1954), journalist, commentator and rock critic.
 Ratko Glavina (born 1941), actor.
 Nikša Gligo (born 1946), musicologist and university professor.
 Albert Goldstein (1943-2007), intellectual, writer, publisher, poet and translator.
 Ivo Goldstein (born 1958), historian, author and ambassador.
 Nataša Ivanović (born 1978), politician.
 Nataša Janjić (born 1981), film, stage and television actress.
 Nikola Kalinic (born 1988), footballer.
 Ivana Kapitanović (born 1994), handballer.
 Josip Karaman (1864-1921), film director and photographer.
 Miro Kovač (born 1968), historian.
 Vicko Krstulović (1905-1988), communist revolutionary.
 Robert Kurbaša (born 1977), actor.
 Boris Lalovac (born 1976), economist and politician.
 Draghixa Laurent (born 1973), pornographic actress and singer.
 Mirjana Majurec (1952-2022), actress.
 Joško Marušić (born 1952), animator, caricaturist, illustrator and university professor.
 Virgil Meneghello Dinčić (1876–1944), painter and art teacher.
 Nedjeljko Mihanović (1930-2022), politician.
 Neven Mimica (born 1953), politician and diplomat.
 Jerolim Miše (1890-1970), painter, teacher, and art critic.
 Nikola Moro (born 1998), footballer.
 Tina Morpurgo (1907-1944), painter.
 Vid Morpurgo (1838-1911), industrialist, publisher, politician and member.
 Mirando Mrsić (born 1959), physician and politician.
 Natko Nodilo (1834-1912), politician, historian, journalist, university professor, and chancellor.
 Ranko Ostojić (born 1962), lawyer and centre-left politician.
 Jurica Pavičić (born 1965), writer, columnist and film critic.
 Jure Pavlović (born 1985), film director and TV directing.
 Frane Perišin (born 1960), actor.
 Milan Pleština (born 1961), actor.
 Marinko Prga (born 1971), actor.
 Kruno Prijatelj (1922-1998), art historian, art critic and University professor.
 Faretta Radic (born 1998), topmodel.
 Ivana Roščić (born 1978), actress.
 Vicko Ruic (born 1959), film director, screenwriter, producer and actor.
 Ivo Sanader (born 1953), politician.
 Pjer Šimunović (born 1962), Ambassador to the United States.
 Marija Škaričić (born 1977), actress.
 Ivo Šlaus (born 1931), nuclear and particle physicist.
 Petar Smajić (1910–1985), painter and sculptor.
 Slavko Sobin (born 1984), actor.
 Olga Spiridonović (1923-1994), film, theatre and television actress.
 Joško Svaguša (born 1972), entrepreneur, former politician and former president. 
 Ognjen Sviličić (born 1971), screenwriter and film director.
 Tonio Teklić (born 1999), footballer.
 Xenia Valderi (born 1926), actress.
 Nadan Vidošević (born 1960), politician, businessman and entrepreneur arrested.
 Emanuel Vidović (1870-1953), painter and graphic artist.
 Igor Zidić (born 1939), art historian, art critic, poet and essayist.
 Josip Zovko (1970-2019), actor and director.
 Vjeran Zuppa (born 1940), intellectual, dramaturge, literature theorist, poet, translator and former chairman of the Theater ITD.
 Miomir Žužul (born 1955), diplomat and politician.

Stari Grad
 Niko Bartulović (1890-1945), writer, publisher, journalist and translator.
 Ljubo Benčić (1905-1992), footballer.
 Petar Hektorović (1487-1572), writer.
 Šime Ljubić (1822-1896), archaeologist, theologian, and historian.
 Jakša Račić (1868-1943), politician and medical doctor.
 Juraj Škarpa (1881-1952), sculptor.

Strizivojna
 Stjepan Damjanović (born 1946), linguist, philologist and paleoslavist.

Sveti Juraj
 Božo Grkinić (1913-1996), water polo and basketball player and coach.
 Dragutin Prica (1867-1960), admiral.

Traù
 Mila Schön (1916-2008), fashion designer.

Tremušnjak
 Filip Kljajić (1913-1943), fighter during World War II and political commissar of the 1st Proletarian Brigade.

Trogir
 Vicko Andrić (1793-1866), architect.
 Petar Berislavić (1475-1520), noble family and bishop.
 Coriolano Cippico (1425–1493), Dalmatian nobleman, landowner, civil servant, humanist and military commander.
 Vinko Coce (1954-2013), opera and pop singer.
 Žana Čović (born 1989), handballer.
 Faretta (born 1998), fashion model.
 Rafaela Franić (born 1990), fashion model.
 John of Trogir (1034-1111), bishop.
 Vinko Kandija (1934-2002), handballer player and coach.
 Ivan Katalinić (born 1951), footballer.
 Augustin Kažotić (1260-1323), bishop.
 Johannes Lucius (1604-1679), bibliography and historiography.
 Mirko Oremuš (born 1988), footballer.
 Vedran Rožić (born 1954), footballer player and Hajduk chairman.
 Ana Tzarev (born 1937), artist.
 Biserka Višnjić (born 1953), handballer.
 Toni Vitali (born 1991), basketball.

Valpovo
 Ervin Cseh (1838-1918), politician.
 Josip Hamm (1905-1986), language and literature.
 Matija Petar Katančić (1750–1825), writer, professor of aesthetics and archaeology, lexicographer, and numismatist.
 Bruno Maltar (born 1994), racing cyclist.
 Đuro Salaj (1889-1958), politician.

Varaždin
 Mirko Androić (1922-1982), historian and archivist.
 Ivan Belostenec (1594–1675), linguist, lexicographer and poet.
 Antun Blažić (1916-1943), Partisan and People's Hero of Yugoslavia.
 Mirko Bogović (1816-1893), poet and politician.
 Slavko Brankov (1951-2006), film, theatre and television actor.
 Mirko Breyer (1863-1946), writer, bibliographer and antiquarian.
 Zdravko Brkljačić (born 1936), footballer.
 Ivan Čehok (born 1965), politician.
 Fernando Consag (1703-1759), missionary, explorer and cartographer.
 Blaženka Divjak (born 1967), Mathematician and politician.
 Robert Herjavec (born 1962), businessman, investor, and television personality.
 Lidija Horvat-Dunjko (born 1967), soprano vocalist.
 Ladislav Ilčić (born 1970), politician and violinist.
 Luka Ivanušec (born 1998), footballer.
 Vatroslav Jagić (1838-1923), Philologist-slavist, linguist and paleographer.
 Antonio Jakoliš (born 1992), footballer.
 Ljubomir Kerekeš (born 1960), film, theatre and television actor.
 Vlado Košić (born 1959), bishop.
 Željko Krajan (born 1979), tennis coach and former professional player.
 Ivan Kukuljević Sakcinski (1816-1889), historian, politician and writer.
 Iva Mišak (born 1993), alpine skier.
 Samuel Louis Mosinger (1804-1872), businessman, merchant and society.
 Ivan Padovec (1800-1873), baroque.
 Pero Pirker (1927-1972), politician.
 Igor Prahić (born 1987), footballer.
 Ladislav Rakovac (1847-1906), physician.
 Vjekoslav Rosenberg-Ružić (1870-1954), composer, conductor and music educator.
 Silvester Sabolčki (1979-2003), footballer.
 Mario Sačer (born 1990), footballer.
 Roman Schmidt (1893-1959), credited with six aerial victories.
 Karlo Šimek (born 1988), footballer.
 Koloman Sović (1899-1971), cyclist.
 Miljenko Stančić (1926-1977), painter and graphic artist.
 Karlo Težak (born 1993), footballer.
 Goran Trbuljak (born 1948), cinematographer, photographer and conceptual artist.
 Željko Vincek (born 1986), sprinter.
 Zlatko Vitez (born 1950), theatre and film actor.
 Ljubomir Vračarević (1947-2013), martial artist and founder of Real Aikido.

Varaždinske Toplice
 Lavoslav Horvat (1901-1989), architect.
 Ruža Pospiš-Baldani (born 1942), operatic mezzo-soprano.

Velika Pisanica
 Edo Murtić (1921-2005), painter.

Veli Rat
 Marijan Oblak (1919-2008), archbishop.

Veternica
 Matija Skurjeni (1898-1990), painter.

Vinišće
 Giovanni Dalmata (1440–1514), sculptor.

Vinkovci
 Mario Banožić (born 1979), politician.
 Goran Bare (born 1965), rock musician and singer.
 Hrvoje Brkić (born 1983), biophysicist.
 Dragan Crnogorac (born 1978), president.
 Mavro Frankfurter (1875–1942), Holocaust at the Jasenovac concentration camp.
 Ivan Ladislav Galeta (1947-2014), multimedia artist, cinematographer and film director.
 Aleksandar Goldštajn (1912-2010), university professor, law scholar, writer and constitutional court judge.
 Goran Hadžić (1958-2016), war criminal and a nationalist politician.
 Carl Heitzmann (1836-1896), pathologist and dermatologist.
 Lavoslav Kadelburg (1910-1994), lawyer, judge, polyglot and activist.
 Albert Kinert (1919-1987), artist and illustrator who worked in the media of painting and graphic arts.
 Slavko Kopač (1913-1995), painter, sculptor and poet.
 Ivan Kozarac (1885-1910), novelist, poet and writer of short stories.
 Josip Kozarac (1858-1906), writer.
 Rikard Lang (1913-1994), university professor, lawyer and economist.
 Dina Merhav (1936-2022), sculptor.
 Eugen Miskolczy (1907-1947), physician, partisan and major in the Yugoslav People's Army.
 Otto Miskolczy (1909-1978),  entrepreneur.
 Vanja Radauš (1906-1975), sculptor, painter and writer.
 Josip Runjanin (1821-1878), soldier and composer.
 Stjepan Šejić (born 1981), comic book writer and artist.
 Shorty (born 1980), rapper.
 Ferdo Šišić (1869-1940), historian.
 Davor Škrlec (born 1963), electrical engineer and liberal politician.
 Josip Šokčević (1811-1896), lieutenant marshal.
 Rudolf Sremec (1909-1999), film director.
 Sava Šumanović (1896-1942), painter.
 Vesna Tominac Matačić (born 1968), actress.
 Valens (328–378), roman emperor.
 Valentinian I (321-375), roman emperor.
 Mladen Vulić (born 1969), actor.

Virovitica
 Željka Antunović (born 1955), politician.
 Ivan Dečak (born 1979), singer.
 Stanija Dobrojević (born 1985), glamour model, reality television personality and former recording artist.
 Damir Doma (born 1981), fashion designer.
 Miroslav Feldman (1899-1976), poet and writer.
 Ivica Kirin (born 1970), politician.
 Tomislav Maretić (1854-1938), linguist and lexicographer.
 Ksenija Marinković (born 1966), film, television and theatre actress.
 Zrinko Ogresta (born 1958), screenwriter and film director.
 Ivan Šibl (1917-1989), writer and politician.
 Vlado Singer (1908-1943), politician.
 Tomislav Tolušić (born 1979), politician.
 Dijana Vukomanović (born 1967), politician.
 Karlo Weissmann (1890-1953), physician.

Viškovci
 Ivan Tišov (1879-1928), painter.

Vranjic
 Frane Bulić (1846-1934), priest, archaeologist, and historian.

Vukovar
 Stanko Abadžić (born 1952), photographer and photojournalist.
 Marko Babić (1965-2007), army officer.
 Rudy Baker (born 1898, date of death unknown), a Communist Party USA (CPUSA) official.
 Antun Bauer (1911-2000), museologist and collector.
 Franjo Benzinger (1899-1991), pharmacist.
 Ivana Bodrožić (born 1982), writer and poet.
 Zoran Bognar (born 1965), poet and writer.
 Dražen Bošnjaković (born 1961), politician.
 Jovan Gavrilović (1796-1877), historian, politician, statesman, and public figure.
 General Woo (born 1977), rapper.
 Siniša Glavašević (1960-1991), reporter.
 Igor Kovač (born 1983), actor.
 Tomislav Merčep (1952-2020), politician and paramilitary leader.
 Josip Mrzljak (born 1944), bishop.
 Zaharije Orfelin (1726-1785), Poet, writer and historian.
 Pavao Pavličić (born 1946), writer, literary historian and translator.
 Wagner Ribeiro (born 1987), footballer.
 Leopold Ružička (1887-1976), scientist and joint winner.
 Ana Sladetić (born 1985), contemporary artist.
 Károly Unkelhäusser (1866-1938), politician.
 Predrag Vuković (born 1966), politician.

Zabok
 Vedran Celjak (born 1991), footballer.
 Ksaver Šandor Gjalski (1854-1935), writer and civil servant.
 Siniša Hajdaš Dončić (born 1974), politician.
 Adam Končić (born 1968), singer and actor.
 Dominik Kotarski (born 2000), footballer.
 Damir Krznar (born 1972), footballer.
 Adrian Liber (born 2001), footballer.
 Vlatka Oršanić (born 1958), opera singer.
 Dominik Rešetar (born 2000), footballer.

Zadar

Zagreb
 Alfred Albini (1896-1978), architect.
 Oskar Alexander (1876-1953), academic painter and professor.
 Juraj Andrassy (1896–1977), jurist.
 Ante Anin (born 1966), architect.
 Robert Baća (1949-2019), sculptor and painter.
 Tatiana Bezjak (born 1971), sculptor and writer.
 Edvin Biuković (1969-1999), comic book artist.
 Milan Blazekovic (1940-2019), animator.
 Ana Borovečki (born 1973), clinical pharmacologist and toxicologist.
 Neven Budak (born 1957), historian.
 Dora Budor (born 1984), artist.
 Blaženka Despot (1930-2001), philosopher, socialist feminist, and sociologist.
 Marijan Dragman (1910-1945), alpinist, photographer, sportsman, and painter.
 Marta Ehrlich (1910-1980), painter.
 Zoran Ferić (born 1961), Short story writer, novelist and columnist
 Ivan Fijolić (born 1976), artist and sculpture.
 Vera Fischer (1925-2009), sculptor.
 Ivana Franke (born 1973), contemporary visual artist.
 Ingeborg Fülepp (born 1952), artist, university teacher, curator and film editor.
 Vesna Girardi-Jurkić (1944-2012), archeologist and museologist.
 Ivo Goldstein (born 1958), historian, author and ambassador.
 Zlatko Grgić (1931-1988), animator.
 Mirela Holy (born 1971), politician.
 Nina Ivančić (born 1953), artist and painter.
 Sanja Iveković (born 1949), photographer, performer, sculptor and installation artist.
 Marijan Jevšovar (1922-1998), painter.
 Svjetlan Junaković (born 1961), painter, sculptor and illustrator.
 Dario Juričan (born 1976), film director, producer, and political activist.
 Jagoda Kaloper (1947-2016), painter and actress.
 Radoslav Katičić (1930-2019), linguist, classical philologist, Indo-Europeanist, Slavist and Indologist.
 Nada Klaić (1920-1988), historian.
 Mira Klobučar (1888-1956), painter.
 Matija Kluković (born 1982), independent film director.
 Igor Kordej (born 1957), comic book artist, illustrator, graphic designer and scenographer.
 Marinko Koščec (born 1967), writer.
 Sylva Koscina (1933-1994), actress.
 Vlado Kristl (1923-2004), filmmaker and artist.
 Igor Kusin (born 1963), linguist and author.
 Zvonimir Lončarić (1927-2004), sculptor and painter.
 Darko Macan (born 1966), writer, illustrator and comic book artist.
 Dalibor Matanić (born 1975), filmmaker.
 Ranko Matasović (born 1968), linguist, Indo-Europeanist and Celticist.
 Dubravko Merlić (born 1960), journalist, television producer and author.
 Jasen Mesić (born 1972), politician.
 Kristijan Milić (born 1969), television and feature film director.
 Franjo Neidhardt (1907-1984), architect.
 Velimir Neidhardt (born 1943), architect.
 Vera Nikolić Podrinska (1886-1972), painter and baroness.
 Lukas Nola (1964-2022), film director and screenwriter.
 Jelena Pavičić Vukičević (born 1975), politician.
 Vlatko Pavletić (1930-2007), politician, university professor, literary critic and essayist.
 Martin Previšić (born 1984), historian.
 Srećko Puntarić (born 1952), cartoonist.
 Vesna Pusić (born 1953), sociologist and politician.
 Josip Račić (1885-1908), painter.
 Esad Ribić (born 1972), comic book artist and animator.
 Zvonimir Richtmann (1901-1941), physicist, philosopher, politician and publicist.
 Goran Rušinović (born 1968), film director and screenwriter.
 Đuro Seder (1927-2022), painter.
 Branimir Šenoa (1879-1939), painter, graphic artist and art historian.
 Danilo Šerbedžija (born 1971), film director.
 Filip Šimetin Šegvić (born 1986), historian and teaching assistant.
 Zlatko Sirotić (born 1945), painter and illustrator.
 Dubravko Škiljan (1949-2007), linguist, philology and semiotics.
 Irena Škorić (born 1981), film director and screenwriter.
 Slobodan Šnajder (born 1948), writer and publicist.
 Goran Sudžuka (born 1969), comic book artist.
 Tomislav Sunić (born 1953), translator, far-right activist and a former professor.
 Goran Švob (1947-2013), philosopher, logician, and author.
 Sonja Tarokić (born 1988), film director and screenwriter.
 Marino Tartaglia (1894-1984), painter and art teacher.
 Zivorad Tomic (born 1951), film director, screenwriter and critic.
 Ivana Tomljenović-Meller (1906-1988), graphic designer and art teacher.
 Milan Trenc (born 1962), illustrator, animator, film director and novelist.
 Marijan Trepše (1887-1964), painter, graphic artist and set designer.
 Hrvoje Turković (born 1943), film theorist, film critic and university professor.
 Vladimir Varlaj (1895-1962), artist.
 Danijel Žeželj (born 1966), comic book artist, animator, painter and illustrator and author of a number of graphic novels.
 Milena Žic-Fuchs (born 1954), linguist.

Zmijavci
 Milan Ivkošić (born 1947), journalist and writing.
 Ivan Milas (1939-2011), lawyer and politician.

Žrnovo
 Petar Šegedin (1909-1998), writer.

Županja
 Đuka Galović (1924-2015), folk musician and songwriter.
 Indira Levak (born 1973), singer.
 Melita Lorković (1907-1987), pianist and music pedagogue.
 Matija Mišić (born 1992), footballer.
 Suzana Nikolić (born 1965), film, theatre and television actress.
 Željko Pahek (born 1954), comic book artist and graphic novel creator, scriptwriter, painter, illustrator and caricaturist.
 Amiel Shomrony (1917-2009), Holocaust survivor.
 Dario Župarić (born 1992), footballer.

References

External links

 
City